Nassa tuamotuensis is a species of sea snail, a marine gastropod mollusk in the family Muricidae.

Description
The shell size varies between 24 mm and 64 mm.

Distribution
This species is distributed in the Pacific Ocean along the Cook Islands and Tuamotus and the Society Islands.

References

External links
 

Muricidae
Gastropods described in 1996
Nassa (gastropod)